Leonardo Severoli (1605–1652) was a Roman Catholic prelate who served as Bishop of San Severo (1650–1652).

Biography
Leonardo Severoli was born in 1605 in Faenza, Italy.
On 27 Jun 1650, he was appointed during the papacy of Pope Innocent X as Bishop of San Severo.
On 3 Jul 1650, he was consecrated bishop Marcantonio Franciotti, Cardinal-Priest of Santa Maria della Pace, with Luca Torreggiani, Archbishop of Ravenna, and Ranuccio Scotti Douglas, Bishop Emeritus of Borgo San Donnino, serving as co-consecrators. 
He served as Bishop of San Severo until his death in 1652.

References

External links and additional sources
 (for Chronology of Bishops) 
 (for Chronology of Bishops) 

17th-century Italian Roman Catholic bishops
Bishops appointed by Pope Innocent X
1605 births
1652 deaths